The Tirranna was a Norwegian merchant ship captured by the German raider Atlantis during the Second World War. She took on the passengers and crew of the Kemmendine which had been captured and sunk by the Atlantis in July 1940 and sailed for France as a prize ship with a cargo of looted goods. On 22 September 1940 she was torpedoed off the coast of France by the British submarine Tuna and sank with 87 lives lost. The survivors were taken to a German naval facility in Royan.

References

External links 

Maritime incidents in September 1940
Merchant ships
Ships sunk by British submarines
Ships of Norway